Cyanopepla quadricolor is a moth of the subfamily Arctiinae. It was described by Cajetan Felder in 1874. It is found in Colombia.

References

Cyanopepla
Moths described in 1874